Tlatilco was a large pre-Columbian village in the Valley of Mexico situated near the modern-day town of the same name in the Mexican Federal District. It was one of the first chiefdom centers to arise in the Valley, flourishing on the western shore of Lake Texcoco during the Middle Pre-Classic period, between the years of 1200 BCE and 200 BCE. It gives its name to the "Tlatilco culture", which also included the town of Tlapacoya, on the eastern shore of Lake Chalco.

Tlatilco is noted in particular for its high quality pottery pieces, many featuring Olmec iconography, and its figurines, including Olmec-style baby-face figurines. Much else, however, seems to be in a native ceramic tradition. These Olmec-style artifacts have led to speculation concerning the nature of Olmec influence on other Mesoamerican cultures.

The Tlatilco site was used in modern times as a source of clay for brick-making. By the 1930s, many of the ancient artifacts thereby uncovered made their way into the hands of collectors, including Miguel Covarrubias, artist and ethnographer. Covarrubias led the first controlled excavation in 1942. By 1949, over 200 burials were identified at Tlatilco, leading to its categorisation as a necropolis. Two major archaeological excavations followed, with over 500 burials eventually identified, many with intact grave offerings. The last field season also undertook a systematic survey of non-burial structures, leading to the realization that these hundreds of burials were apparently located under ancient houses—although no traces of them remain - as well as among the various trash pits, and that Tlatilco was not a necropolis, but rather a major chiefdom center.

Many burials, primarily of high status individuals, show evidence of dental mutilation and artificial cranial deformation, most probably through the use of cradleboards.

The Tlatilcans' agriculture was focused on maize, but also included beans, amaranth, and squash, and chili peppers. These plants were supplemented with various fowl, including migratory birds, wild rabbits and other smaller mammals, and deer and antelope.

Tlatilco reached its heyday during the period from 1000 to 700 BCE, during the Olmec horizon. The following Zacatenco phase (700-400 BCE) saw a cessation of the use of Olmec iconography and forms.

Tlatilco figurines

Many Tlatilco figurines show deformities or other anomalies, including a "duality" mask and several two-headed female figures. This has led some researchers to wonder whether Tlatilco was perhaps a cluster site for conjoined twins.

The name "Tlatilco" comes from the Nahuatl language, in which it means "place of mounds".

Notes

References
Adams, Richard E W (1991) Prehistoric Mesoamerica, University of Oklahoma Press, Norman, Oklahoma.
Bendersky, Gordon (2000); "Tlatilco, Diprosopus, and Emergence of Medical Illustrations" in Perspectives in Biology & Medicine; Summer 2000, v43 #4, p477. 
Blanton, Richard E.; Kowalewski, Stephen A.; Feinman, Gary M.;Finsten, Laura M. (1993) Ancient Mesoamerica: A Comparison of Change in Three Regions, Cambridge University Press, .
Diehl, Richard A. (2004) The Olmecs: America's First Civilization, Thames & Hudson, London.
Kennedy, G. E. (2001) "The 3,000-year history of conjoined twins", Western Journal of Medicine, September 2001, 175(3): 176-177.
 (1996) "The Basin of Mexico: a Multimillennial Development Toward Cultural Complexity", in Olmec Art of Ancient Mexico, eds. E. P. Benson and B. de la Fuente, Washington D.C., pp. 83–93.

External links
  Information about Tlatilco.

Mesoamerican sites
Tlatilco culture
Valley of Mexico
Populated places established in the 2nd millennium BC
2nd-millennium BC establishments